SK Faiaz (born 3 March 1995) is an Indian professional footballer who plays as a winger for I-League club Mohammedan.

Career
Faiaz was registered by Mohammedan in July 2017 before the 2017–18 Calcutta Premier Division. On 20 August 2017, Faiaz scored a brace for Mohammedan against Southern Samity.

After the local season with Mohammedan, Faiaz joined Mohun Bagan in the I-League. He made his debut for the club on 25 November 2017 in their opening match against Minerva Punjab. He came on as a 66th minute substitute for Chesterpoul Lyngdoh as Mohun Bagan drew 1–1.

Career statistics

Club

Honours
Mohammedan Sporting
Calcutta Football League: 2021
I-League runner-up: 2021–22

References

1995 births
Living people
People from Howrah
Indian footballers
Mohammedan SC (Kolkata) players
Mohun Bagan AC players
Association football midfielders
Footballers from West Bengal
Calcutta Football League players
I-League players
Indian Super League players
ATK (football club) players